Shantikunj is a religious tourist attraction in Haridwar and also the headquarters of All World Gaytri Pariwar.

History 

Shantikunj was established in 1971 by Shriram Sharma and Bhagwati Devi Sharma on a small piece of land. It was expanded over Gayatri Nagar. 

Shantikunj and Dev Sanskriti Vishwavidyalaya functions under the Shri Vedmata Gayatri Trust, headed by Mrs. Shailbala Pandya.

Location 
Shantikunj is located 6 kilometers from Haridwar's railway station towards Rishikesh/Dehradun on NH58 in India. The nearest airports are Jolly Grant Airport, Dehradun and Indira Gandhi International Airport.

References

External links
 
 Newspaper

Haridwar district
Organisations based in Uttarakhand
Organizations established in 1971
1971 establishments in Uttar Pradesh